"Giving You the Best That I Got" is a 1988 song by American R&B recording artist Anita Baker. The music video was filmed inside the 109th Field Artillery in Kingston, Pennsylvania. The song appears on Baker's album of the same name, which was released in the fall of that year. The song was written by Baker, Skip Scarborough and Randy Holland.

Chart performance
The song was Baker's highest charting hit on the Billboard Hot 100, where it peaked at number three in December 1988. It also spent two weeks at number one on the Billboard R&B chart in November 1988, Baker's first number one on this tally. In addition, the song spent one week atop the Billboard adult contemporary chart in December 1988.

Awards
The song "Giving You the Best That I Got" was released prior to the Grammy Awards eligibility cutoff date of September 30, allowing it to be nominated for four awards at the Grammy Awards of 1989. The song won in the categories Best R&B Vocal Performance, Female and Best R&B Song; it was also nominated for both Record of the Year and Song of the Year. The album Giving You the Best That I Got was released in October 1988, meaning that it would not be eligible for Grammy consideration until the 1990 ceremony. There, Baker's album won in the category Best Female R&B Vocal Performance, earning her the same award two years running for a song and album of the same title.

Songwriter Skip Scarborough had offered the song to various singers, including Howard Hewett, without success. Prior to recording the song, Baker made some changes to the original, including improvising a scat opening and requesting that the tempo of the song be increased.

In popular culture 
The song was featured in a season 10 episode of Knots Landing. The song was also used in a late 1988 episode of the US daytime soap opera All My Children as well as a 1989 episode of Guiding Light. In 2019, the song appeared in the second episode of season 2 of Pose.

Michael Jordan would often sing this song to his opponents as a way of trash talking them.

Personnel 
 Anita Baker – lead vocals 
 Vernon D. Fails – keyboards 
 Dean "Sir" Gant – acoustic piano 
 Nathan East – bass 
 Omar Hakim – drums 
 Paulinho da Costa – percussion 
 Alex Brown – backing vocals 
 Angel Edwards – backing vocals
 Valerie Pinkston Mayo – backing vocals, BGV arrangements

Charts

Weekly charts

Year-end charts

See also
List of number-one R&B singles of 1988 (U.S.)
List of number-one adult contemporary singles of 1988 (U.S.)

References

External links
Single release info at discogs.com

1988 singles
Anita Baker songs
Songs written by Skip Scarborough
Songs written by Anita Baker
1988 songs
Contemporary R&B ballads
1980s ballads
Elektra Records singles
Song recordings produced by Michael J. Powell